Aryankavu Sastha Temple a Hindu temple and one among the 108 Sastha shrines in the Indian state of Kerala, but also borders the neighboring state of Tamil Nadu. The idol here is believed to be consecrated by sage Parashurama. It is also one among Pancha Sastha temples in Kerala located in the Punalur tehsil of Kollam district, in the eastern forest ranges.

Temple 
The pratishta here is quite different from that of Achankovil, Kulthupuzha and Sabarimala temples. Sastha is depicted as a young boy sitting on an elephant with right leg hanging and left leg being in a folded position, along with his consort Shri Pushkaladevi on the left side and Lord Shiva on the right. As in Sabarimala, the temple too have 18 steps. The temple built in the traditional architectural styles of both Kerala and Tamil Nadu preserves several murals of Hindu deities. Another feature of the temple is that it is built 35 feet below the road level. The Poojas and rituals conducted in the temple is very much similar to the  Shastha Temples .

It is believed that Sastha married Shri Pushkaladevi of Sourashtra community in Aryankavu. The marriage festival is held every year in Aryankavu and the marriage rituals are according to the Sourashtra community .Even now Sourashtrans reach here in groups during the time of ‘Mandalapooja’.

Etymology
The name 'Aryankavu' is believed to be originated from the words "Aryan" which generally denotes the deity Sastha and 'Kavu' being the place where he is worshipped. The deity here is also known as Tiru Aryan.

Location
The temple is located in the north western side of Kollam district in the Indian state of Kerala. People from south can approach the temple via Thiruvananthapuram - Thenmala - Shenkottai highway. The nearest railhead is at Aryankavu and New Aryankavu on Kollam-Shecottai line.

Subordinate deities
The temple has separate shrines for Valiyakadutha, Karuppaswami and Karuppayiamma below the holy steps.

Festivals

The temple has two main annual festivals mainly the Mandalapooja and Thirukalyanam (10th Dhanu). The other noted festivals of the temple are Painguni Uthiram and Kumbhabhishekam.

See also
 Kulathupuzha Sastha Temple
 Achankovil Sree Dharmasastha Temple
 Erumely Sree Dharmasastha Temple
sengottai sastha naduvakurichi

References

Hindu temples in Kollam district